Tsuyu may refer to:
                      
 East Asian rainy season (梅雨)
 Dipping sauce or soup served with Japanese noodles
 Tsuyu Asui (蛙吹 梅雨), a character in the manga and anime series My Hero Academia